Free Range is a 2013 Estonian drama film directed by Veiko Õunpuu. The film was selected as the Estonian entry for the Best Foreign Language Film at the 86th Academy Awards, but it was not nominated.

Cast
Lauri Lagle as Fred  
Jaanika Arum as Susanna 
Laura Peterson as Traitor to the fatherland 
Peeter Volkonski as Fred's father 
Roman Baskin as Susanna's father 
Rita Raave as Susanna's mother 
Meelis Rämmeld as Susanna's father 
Jan Uuspõld as Colleague 
Anne Türnpu as Colleague
Loore Martma as Student 
Marion Undusk as Student 
Mari Abel as Secretary 
Laine Mägi as Trolley driver 
Lauri Kaldoja as Friend 
Jim Ashilevi as Friend 
Liis Lindmaa as Friend 
Markus Luik  as Friend 
Ivo Reinok as Friend 
Triin Ruumet as Friend 
Jass Seljamaa as Friend 
Reginleif Trubetsky as Friend

See also
 List of submissions to the 86th Academy Awards for Best Foreign Language Film
 List of Estonian submissions for the Academy Award for Best Foreign Language Film

References

External links
 

2013 films
2013 drama films
Estonian-language films
Estonian drama films